is a yonkoma manga series written and illustrated by Yuka Santō. An anime adaptation by Hotline aired between April 9 to June 25, 2013, on AT-X and was streamed with English subtitles by Crunchyroll.

Sparrow's Hotel ended in 2014 and was followed by a sequel called Sparrow's Hotel ANNEX.

Plot
Sparrow's Hotel follows the daily activities of Sayuri Satō, Tamaki Shiokawa and Misono as they manage the Sparrow's Hotel along with the many different types of people and misadventures they encounter along the way.

Characters

Main protagonist. She is very attractive causing males to flock to her. She is somewhat dim-witted and possesses ninja-like abilities, such as carrying around hidden kunai, adept fighting skills and talks about her "training."

Manager of the Sparrow's Hotel.

The hotel's bell boy.

The Business Manager of Sparrow's Hotel and older brother of Tamaki. He has a sister complex.

A hotel inspector that is not very good at her job. She later surfaces as a worker of the hotel.

A rival fighter of Sayuri.

A man with a crush on Sayuri

Media

Manga

Volume list

Anime
Sparrow's Hotel is produced by Hotline and Dream Creation. It is directed by Tetsuji Nakamura with character designs by Daisuke Kusakari. The anime is formatted as a series of shorts, with each episode being only a few minutes in length. The series aired on AT-X between April 9 and June 25, 2013. Additionally it aired on KBS and TV Saitama and was streamed online by Niconico and Rakuten ShowTime, and with English subtitles by Crunchyroll. The song "Welcome to Sparrow's Hotel" by Minori Chihara and Haruka Nagashima is used as an opening theme for the first 6 episodes and as an ending theme for the rest. The entire 12 episode series was released on DVD on September 4, 2013. The DVD included reanimated versions of the first 6 episodes in addition to a 13th OVA episode.

Episode list

References

External links
Official website 

Anime series based on manga
Comedy anime and manga
Takeshobo manga
Yonkoma
Seinen manga